The Thomas L. Allen House is a historic house located at 98 North Main Street in Coalville, Utah.

Description and history 
Constructed in the 1880s, it is a "fine" house significant for association with Thomas L. Allen, who was an architect and builder as well as being a LDS area leader and a businessman. Allen is notable specifically for designing and building the National Register-listed Coalville Tabernacle, and built this house, too. A painted plaster ceiling in the parlor, by Danish immigrant C.M. Olsen, is a "highlight" of the house, and is similar to works by Olsen in the Coalville Tabernacle.

It was listed on the National Register of Historic Places on July 23, 1982.

References

Houses on the National Register of Historic Places in Utah
Italianate architecture in Utah
1880s establishments in Utah Territory
Houses in Summit County, Utah
National Register of Historic Places in Summit County, Utah